Richard Bartram (1749–1826) was the English Consul of Civita Vecchia in the early 19th century and involved in the saving of the Jacobite Royal Papers.

Early life
Bartram was born in Trimingham, Norfolk, in 1749 the only son of Captain Richard Bartram of Great Yarmouth Norfolk. His tombstone records: 

Bartram however did have a sister and later his niece and nephew tried to challenge his will which left everything to his relative Cubbitt Engall Bartram. Bartram refers to Cubbitt Engall Bartram as his nephew but is actually more distantly related. Bartram is a first cousin of Cubbitt's grandfather William Bartram (born 1744).

There is interesting correspondence between the Reverend William Gunn of Smallburgh Norfolk and the Bartrams in Civita Vecchia. Cubitt first arrived in Civita Vecchia in 1820 to join his relative Richard Bartram and became his heir. The Norfolk Record Office archive on William Gunn states:   Cubbitt Bartram was also joined by his brother John Bartram in Civita Vecchia in the business.

Jacobite connections
Bartram was visited by his Jacobite relative Sir Robert Bartram (1761–1844) of Norfolk (a grandson of Sir James Alexander Wright Bt the Last Royal Governor of Georgia) in 1795. Robert Bartram was an uncle of Cubbitt Engall Bartram. Bartram introduced Robert to his future wife Anna Modin (Maiden/Maidman), an Italian Jew who was a granddaughter of Prince Henry Stuart and his Jewish mistress (before he entered the Church). Robert's sons Sir James Bartram of Metton and William John Bartram of Aylmerton were also Jacobites (connected with Sir Henry Drummond and Joseph Wolff) who also visited Richard Bartram and their cousins Cubbitt and John Bartram in Civita Vecchia.

Royal adventure and imprisonment
In "Calendar of the Stuart papers belonging to His Majesty the King, preserved at Windsor Castle" it tells the story of how the Stuart papers were brought to Windsor Castle and the role that Bartram played in this adventure. 

Bartram died in 1826 in Civita Vechhia leaving his business to his adopted heir and relative Cubbitt Engall Bartram (born 1798 Brumstead Norfolk) the son of James Wright Bartram and Elizabeth Engall of Brumstead Norfolk.

References

18th-century English people
People from North Norfolk (district)
1749 births
1826 deaths